Hodgenville is a home rule-class city in LaRue County, Kentucky, United States. It is the seat of its county. Hodgenville sits along the North Fork of the Nolin River. The population was 3,206 at the 2010 census. It is included in the Elizabethtown metropolitan area.

History

Robert Hodgen, a Pennsylvania native who moved to Virginia, purchased  of land in the vicinity. In 1789, after the Revolutionary War, when settlers started moving west into Kentucky, he built a mill at the site. After his death, the community that developed around it was called "Hodgenville" upon the petition of his widow and children. The United States post office at the site, however, was known as "Hodgensville" from 1826 to 1904.

The city was formally incorporated by the state assembly on February 18, 1836.

Abraham Lincoln was born in a small cabin on Sinking Spring Farm near Hodgenville on February 12, 1809. About two years later, the family moved to another farm in the Hodgenville area. Despite claims made later, the cabin Lincoln was born in was likely destroyed by the time of his assassination.

The Abraham Lincoln Birthplace National Historical Park labels the replica cabin, which was built thirty years after his death, the "Traditional Lincoln Birthplace Cabin". The significance of the two Hodgenville sites (birthplace and boyhood home) are found in the setting. Preservation of these two national sites allows visitors to see the landscape of the earliest period of Abraham Lincoln's life. The Lincoln Museum is opened for visitors downtown, and two bronze Abraham Lincoln statues stand at the town square, one of Lincoln as a child, the other as an adult.

Geography
Hodgenville is in central LaRue County, in the valley of the North Fork of the Nolin River, a west- and south-flowing tributary of the Green River. U.S. Route 31E passes through the center of Hodgenville, leading northeast  to Bardstown and south  to Glasgow.

Climate
The climate in this area is characterized by hot, humid summers and generally mild to cool winters.  According to the Köppen Climate Classification system, Hodgenville has a humid subtropical climate, abbreviated "Cfa" on climate maps.

Demographics

As of the census of 2000, there were 2,874 people, 1,235 households, and 781 families living in the city. The racial makeup of the city was 86.64% White, 11.27% African American, 0.24% Native American, 0.07% Asian, 0.35% from other races, and 1.43% from two or more races. Hispanic or Latino of any race were 1.18% of the population.

There were 1,235 households, out of which 29.6% had children under the age of 18 living with them, 42.3% were married couples living together, 18.1% had a female householder with no husband present, and 36.7% were non-families. 34.1% of all households were made up of individuals, and 17.4% had someone living alone who was 65 years of age or older. The average household size was 2.17 and the average family size was 2.76.

The age distribution was 22.8% under the age of 18, 7.9% from 18 to 24, 25.2% from 25 to 44, 22.8% from 45 to 64, and 21.3% who were 65 years of age or older. The median age was 41 years. For every 100 females, there were 82.7 males. For every 100 females age 18 and over, there were 76.8 males.

The median income for a household in the city was $25,132, and the median income for a family was $37,125. Males had a median income of $30,678 versus $18,095 for females. The per capita income for the city was $14,794. About 16.9% of families and 22.3% of the population were below the poverty line, including 27.7% of those under age 18 and 21.5% of those age 65 or over.

Education
Hodgenville has a lending library, the LaRue County Public Library.

Notable people
These are people who were born, raised, or lived in Hodgenville.

Abraham Lincoln, 16th President of the United States; born in Hodgenville.
Danny Little Bear, Native American professional wrestler
 Erin Boley, former University of Oregon basketball player who has also represented the US in international 3-on-3 competition

References

External links

 

Cities in Kentucky
Cities in LaRue County, Kentucky
County seats in Kentucky
Elizabethtown metropolitan area
Abraham Lincoln